Glipa inflammata is a species of beetle in the genus Glipa. It was described in 1862.

References

inflammata
Beetles described in 1862